This is an order of battle listing the Australian and German Empire forces during the Australian occupation of German New Guinea between September and November 1914.

Australian forces

Naval forces 
Vice Admiral George Patey
Battlecruisers

Second class protected cruisers

Light cruisers

Destroyers

Submarines
 (lost at sea)

Submarine tenders

Supply vessels
SS Aorangi
Colliers

SS Whangape
SS Waihora
Oilers
SS Murex
Troop transports
 – Commander J.B. Stevenson
HMAT Kanowna (left at Port Moresby)

Landing forces 
Colonel William Holmes
Australian Naval and Military Expeditionary Force
1st Battalion, Australian Naval and Military Expeditionary Force – 1000 troops
6 companies of RAN Naval Reserve – Commander J.A.H. Beresford – 500 troops
Kennedy Regiment – 500 troops (left at Port Moresby)
2 machine gun sections
Signal section
AAMC detachment

German Empire forces 
Rittmeister Carl von Klewitz
Lt. Robert von Blumenthal
Polizeitruppe

References 

World War I orders of battle
1914 in German New Guinea
German New Guinea order of battle
1914 in the German colonial empire
Battles of World War I involving Australia
Battles of World War I involving Germany
September 1914 events
October 1914 events
November 1914 events